The men's hammer throw at the 2017 Asian Athletics Championships was held on 8 July.

Results

References
Results

Hammer
Hammer throw at the Asian Athletics Championships